Margaret Britton Vaughn (born 1938 in Murfreesboro, Tennessee) is Tennessee's poet laureate.

Personal life 
Vaughn was born on July 16, 1938 in Murfreesboro, Tennessee. Her father, Winfred Vaughn, a fire fighter, was killed in the line of duty when Vaughn was 9 months old. When Vaughn was four years old she moved with her remarried mother and brother to Gulfport, Mississippi.  

Vaughn was baptized Methodist the Methodist church and raised in the Church of Christ. She now attends an the Episcopal Church. Her belief in hypocrisy and unnecessary rules of the church inspired her book You're Laughing, Ain’t Ya, God?

Vaughn lives in Bell Buckle, Tennessee and is frequently visited by people seeking mentorship, advice and conversations about poetry. Celebrity visitors include Bill Moyers and Maya Angelou. In recent years, Vaughn has overcome both kidney and breast cancer

Vaughn was friends with late country singer Loretta Lynn, whom she met through the Wilburn brothers in the 1960s. They bonded over similar writing styles and collaborated throughout their careers. Vaughn helped write Lynn's Grammy-nominated 2004 song "Miss Being Mrs. Lynn".

Career 
Vaughn attended Perkinston Junior College and transferred to Mississippi Southern College, but she ultimately left this school without a degree in her senior year. Twenty-five years later, she completed her degree at Middle Tennessee State University with a degree in theater. 

Vaughn has expressed that the talents of poetry are inherited and their pursuit inevitable. She herself gave up her career of seventeen years in advertising to pursue writing full time, to her family and friends’ dismay. She began this transition by working in a newspaper to build her skills then fully committing to poetry. She is the only recipient of the Mark Twain fellowship from Elmira College. Her time in a place Mark Twain once lived in inspired her work, Foretasting Heaven: Conversations with Twain at Quarry Farm.

Vaughn describes her writing as communicating the experience of living in small towns. From a young age, she was inspired by and heavily influenced by country music and wrote poems and songs. She has also written plays performed at the numerous Tennessee theaters; her most famous play, I Wonder if Eleanor Roosevelt Ever Made a Quilt, was performed at the National Quilter's Convention.  

In 1995, the Tennessee state legislature selected Vaughn to be Tennessee's poet laureate citing many of the plays, collections, and books Vaughn wrote throughout her career and her performances and outreach throughout the state of Tennessee. As poet laureate, Vaughn wrote Tennessee's bicentennial poem, inaugural poems for many Tennessee governors including current governor, Bill Lee, and a poem to commemorate the 50th anniversary of the US Air Force.

Bibliography

References

Living people
American women poets
Writers from Tennessee
Poets Laureate of Tennessee
1938 births
People from Murfreesboro, Tennessee
21st-century American women